Sex and Love is the tenth studio album recorded by Spanish recording artist Enrique Iglesias. It was released on 14 March 2014 by Republic Records. The album's three Spanish singles—"Loco", "El Perdedor", and "Bailando"—reached No. 1 on the Billboard Hot Latin Songs chart. The album features guest vocals from Jennifer Lopez, Kylie Minogue, Descemer Bueno, Pitbull, Flo Rida, Anthony Touma, Romeo Santos, Mickael Carreira, Marco Antonio Solís, Yandel, Gente de Zona, Luan Santana, India Martínez, and Sean Paul. Sex and Love won the Lo Nuestro Award for Pop Album of the Year.

Background
Iglesias explained the reasoning behind the title Sex and Love, saying: "It's one of the first things I thought about when I listened to the whole body of work. I think it's something we can all relate to no matter what religion, no matter what personality, no matter what colour, we can all relate to it."

Iglesias has described his album as fun and sexual, while some of it is more introspective and nostalgic. He then went on to say: "The words go together, but they can be separate and inspire different feelings and thoughts. It's all-encompassing. When you turn on the radio, what are the themes that everybody relates to? We all relate to sex and love. That's why when you hear music – 90% of the time – it derives from those two feelings."

Release and promotion
The album became available for pre-order on 15 February 2014 through Topspin Media. Two versions of the album (a standard 11-track version and a deluxe version with 5 bonus tracks) were released, both physically and digitally. A special deluxe edition for Target and Walmart was also released, which contains two bonus tracks. The album became available for pre-order via iTunes in the United States, Canada, and Mexico on 4 March 2014, and for rest of the world on 5 March 2014. A 30-second sample was released on iTunes for each track.

Critical reception

The album received mixed to positive reviews from music critics. The Daily Star gave the album 3 out of 5 stars, stating that "Iglesias has turned all sleazy Robin Thicke slurring: 'I've been spending all my money on these pretty girls and alcohol, but honey, they got nothing on you' over the funky 'Let Me Be Your Lover'." However, they praised "Loco", stating that it will have fans "getting their Latin freak on". AllMusic also gave the album 3/5, stating "Iglesias walks the line between the dancefloor jams of 2007's Insomniac and the romantic flavor of 2010's Euphoria." They chose "Bailando", "El Perdedor", "Let Me Be Your Lover", and "Loco" as the best songs from the album. Newsday gave the album a "B" grade and described the album as "slick, state-of-the-art Spanglish dance pop". Idolator gave the album 3/5 stars and called the album Euphorias "older cousin", stating that the album "isn’t great but there’s enough decent material to remind you of what Enrique is capable of at full flight". They named "You and I" and "Bailando" as the best singles from the album.

Jake Hamilton of Jake's Take gave the album a "B" grade, stating that "he went overboard on the Spanish tracks". He also praised Iglesias' work in co-writing every song on the album. The Boston Globe gave a favorable review stating that Iglesias "remains a heartthrob for a reason". They also said that "You and I" is "filled with romantic yearning", while his duet with Kylie Minogue in "Beautiful" "manages to be corny yet endearing". They concluded that "It’s the heat not the beat that brings out the best in Iglesias".

Artistdirect gave a positive review and gave the album 5/5 stars, stating that the new album was "Enrique's biggest and boldest masterpiece yet" and that the song "Noche y De Día" "might just be one of the most powerful and potent Latin anthems ever". Culture Fix took note of the album's range of styles stating, "The club-friendly tracks are slickly produced and filled with a high-octane energy, the ballads are complete with a raw charisma and emotion, and the mid-tempo tracks hark back to some of the singer's best work", and scored the album 4/5.

Commercial performance
Sex and Love debuted at No. 8 on the US Billboard 200, selling 24,000 copies in its first week. It is Iglesias's third Billboard Top 10 album after Euphoria (No. 10) and Escape (No. 2). The album also entered the Top 10 of the Canadian Albums Chart. It peaked at No. 1 on the Top Latin Albums and Latin Pop Albums charts simultaneously. It peaked at No. 11 on the UK Albums Chart, selling an approximate of 7,500 copies in first week. It also peaked at No. 6 on the Spanish Albums Chart. The album received a gold certification within the second week of its release in Mexico. Sex and Love was certified double platinum by the RIAA in the Latin field for shipping over 120,000 copies.

Singles
 "Finally Found You" was released as a single on 17 September 2012. The track features vocals from rapper Sammy Adams. Commercially, the song managed to reach the top twenty in Canada and the top forty in Australia, Spain and United States, also topping the Hot Dance Club Songs chart. However, this song was only included on the international deluxe edition of Sex and Love. 
 "Turn the Night Up" was released as the second single from the album and the song debuted at number 30 on the Pop Songs chart and at number 6 on Dance/Electronic Digital Songs, while also debuting at number 62 on the Hot 100. 
 "Loco" was released as the third single from the album and features guest vocals from Bachata singer Romeo Santos. The single reached No. 1 in Spain, Mexico, and the Dominican Republic. Moreover, it also became Iglesias' 23rd No. 1 single on the Hot Latin Tracks chart and 18th No. 1 single on the Latin Pop Airplay chart. It was also ranked at No. 9 on the Billboard Year-End Hot Latin Songs chart for 2013.
 "Heart Attack" was released as the fourth single from the album, released exclusively in North America. It peaked at No. 88 on US Billboard Hot 100 and No. 83 on Canadian Hot 100. It also reached No. 26 on US Mainstream Top 40, making it Iglesias' 16th entry on that chart. 
 "El Perdedor" was released as the fifth single from the album and features guest vocals from Marco Antonio Solis. It serves as the opening theme of Mexican telenovela Lo Que La Vida Me Robó (2013–2014). This is the fifth time that a song by Iglesias has been chosen as an opening theme of a telenovela after "Cosas del Amor", "Nunca Te Olvidaré", "Cuando Me Enamoro", "Marisol" (Por Amarte), and "El País de las Mujeres" (Ruleta Rusa). It became Iglesias' 24th No. 1 single on the Hot Latin Songs chart and 19th No. 1 single on the Latin Pop Airplay chart. 
 "I'm a Freak" was released as the sixth single from the album and the first one to be released worldwide. The song features Cuban-American rapper Pitbull. The song became a commercial success in Europe, peaking within the top ten in the United Kingdom, Spain, Ireland, Finland, and Serbia. It peaked at No. 45 in Australia and No. 52 in Canada. It also peaked at No. 38 on US Mainstream Top 40 chart, making it Iglesias' 17th entry on that chart.
 "Bailando" was the seventh single to be released from the album. It became Iglesias' 25th No. 1 single on the Hot Latin Songs chart and 20th No. 1 single on the Latin Pop Airplay chart. It holds the number 38 spot on the Billboard Year-End Hot 100 singles of 2014 chart. The Spanish version of the song acts as the opening theme of the telenovela Reina de Corazones.
 "Noche y De Día" was released as an eighth and final single on 1 April 2015 and was certified platinum in Spain and gold in Italy. It was officially sent to radio stations in Italy on 3 July 2015.
 "Beautiful", featuring Kylie Minogue, was released as the first promotional single on 14 March 2014. 
"There Goes My Baby" was released as the second promotional single only in the UK in May 2014. It peaked at No. 50 in the UK, but still received extensive airplay.
"Let Me Be Your Lover", featuring Anthony Touma instead of Pitbull, was released as the third and final promotional single in France on 22 September 2014.

Other songs
"I Like How It Feels" was released as a digital download in Australia and some European countries on 23 September 2011, and later in the United States on 4 October 2011. The song was eventually included on the international deluxe edition of Sex and Love.

Tour

Iglesias began his promo tour on 14 February 2014, which took place in San Juan, Puerto Rico. The next day he performed at a sold-out concert at the Madison Square Garden in New York.

The official tour began in Santiago, Chile, where Iglesias performed on 20 May 2014. Two days later, on 22 May 2014, he performed at Luna Park in Buenos Aires, Argentina. A second leg of the tour visited North America in Fall 2014, and was co-headlined by Pitbull. This was the second time that the two Latino stars toured together, with Euphoria Tour being their first.
Demi Lovato was the opening act for some dates in the United Kingdom and Europe.

Enrique Iglesias grossed $194 million with Sex and Love Tour.

Track listing

US versions

Latin American versions

International versions

Notes
  signifies a co-producer.

Charts

Weekly charts

Year-end charts

Certifications and sales

Personnel
Credits for Sex and Love adapted from Allmusic

 Enrique Iglesias – lead vocals, composer, primary artist, quotation author
 Pedro Alfonso – viola, violin
 Randy Malcom Martinez Amey – composer
 Chelsea Avery – A&R
 Chapman Baehler – photography
 Markel Barsagaz – engineer
 Carlos Bedoya – engineer
 Delbert Bowers – composer, mixing assistant
 Claudia Brant – composer
 Richard Bravo – percussion
 Descemer Bueno – composer, featured artist
 Anthony Touma – featured artist
 Alex "Chichi" Caba – guitar
 David Cabrera – arranger, guitar
 Bruno Canale – guitar, engineer
 Ramon 'El Ingeniero' Casillas – composer, programming
 The Cataracs – producer
 Ivan Chevere – engineer, mixing
 Rob Clores – piano
 Tom Coyne – mastering
 Jesusin Cruz – guitar
 Carlos Dalmasí – recording director
 Steeve Daviault – creative director
 Pablo DeLa Loza – keyboards
 Alexander Delgado – composer
 Joaquin Diaz – keyboards
 Tramer Dillard – composer
 DJ Frank E – bass, drums, keyboards, percussion, producer, programming, synthesizer programming
 Benny Faccone – engineer
 Drew FitzGerald – art direction
 Flo Rida – featured artist
 Esther Fortune – vocals (background)
 Guillermo Frias – bongos
 Chris Galland – mixing assistant
 Gente De Zona – featured artist
 Serban Ghenea – mixing
 Wendy Goldstein – A&R
 Rickard Goransson – composer, guitar, producer, vocals (background)
 John Hanes – engineer
 Marty James – composer, vocals (background)
 William Omar Landron – composer
 Marc Lee – engineer
 Konstantin Litvinenko – cello
 Manny López – guitar (acoustic)
 Juan Magán – featured artist
 Manny Marroquin – mixing
 India Martínez – featured artist
 Luan Santana – featured artist
 Aya Merrill – mastering
 Carlos Paucar – arranger, bass, engineer, guitar, mixing, producer, programming, vocal engineer, vocal producer, vocals (background)
 Pitbull – featured artist
 Rome Ramirez – bass, composer, guitar, vocals (background)
 Christian Ramos – composer
 Dante Rivera – bass
 Van Romaine – drums (snare)
 Mickael Carreira – featured artist
 Romeo Santos – featured artist, producer
 Alan Silfen – photography
 Marco Antonio Solís – featured artist
 Ramón Stagnaro – guitar (acoustic)
 Enrique Terrero – guira
 Roberto "Tito" Vazquez – engineer
 Brady Wiggins – programming
 Yandel – featured artist
 Jennifer Lopez – featured artist
 Sean Paul – featured artist

See also
 List of number-one Billboard Latin Albums from the 2010s
 List of number-one Billboard Latin Pop Albums from the 2010s

References

2014 albums
Albums produced by RedOne
Albums produced by the Cataracs
Enrique Iglesias albums
Universal Republic Records albums
Universal Music Latino albums
Spanish-language albums
Albums produced by Mark Taylor (music producer)